Bad Walking Woman is the third album by jazz organist Leon Spencer recorded for the Prestige label in 1972.

Reception
Doug Payne stated the album was "Supremely heavy work from organist Leon Spencer – one of his classic jazz funk sessions for Prestige Records, and a record that shows him opening up his sound a bit more than before!".

Track listing
All compositions by Leon Spencer.
 "Hip Shaker" – 3:50 [actual time = 3:00]  
 "Down On Dowling Street" – 4:55   
 "In Search of Love" – 4:00   
 "If You Were Me and I Were You" – 5:57   
 "Bad Walking Woman" – 5:01   
 "When My Love Has Gone" – 6:10   
 "When Dreams Start to Fade" – 7:42

Personnel
 Leon Spencer – organ, vocals
 Virgil Jones – trumpet (track 5)
 Hubert Laws – flute, piccolo flute (tracks 3, 4, 6 & 7)
 Buzz Brauer – flute, English horn, oboe (tracks 3, 4, 6 & 7)
 Sonny Fortune – alto saxophone (track 5)
 Dave Hubbard – tenor saxophone (tracks 1 & 5)
 Melvin Sparks (tracks 1, 2, 4 & 5), Joe Beck (tracks 3, 6 & 7) – guitar 
 Idris Muhammad – drums
 Buddy Caldwell – congas (tracks 4, 5 & 6)
 Billy Ver Planck – arranger (tracks 3, 4, 6 & 7)
 Unidentified string section – (tracks 3, 4, 6 & 7)

Production
 Ozzie Cadena – producer
 Rudy Van Gelder – engineer

References

Leon Spencer albums
1972 albums
Prestige Records albums
Albums produced by Ozzie Cadena
Albums recorded at Van Gelder Studio